Rangilu Lavarpur' is a village in Gandhinagar district in the Indian state of Gujarat.

Demographics 
 India census, Lavarpur had a population of 5,306. Males constitute 52% of the population and females 48%. Lavarpur has an average literacy rate of 85%, higher than the national average of 59.5%: male literacy is 90%, and female literacy is 80%. In Lavarpur, 12% of the population is under 6 years of age.

Population 
Lavarpur's 80% population is Patel. All of them are from one group. All Patel belongs to Shree 42-84 Kadva Patidar Samaj. Other castes include Gajjar, Vanakar, Prajapati, Chauhans and very limited number of Muslims.

Festival 
Lavarpur is famous for its Dashera festival. Around 30,000 or more people gathered on that day every year and auction for "AARTI" goes in lakhs of rupees. This year 2014 the AARTI goes on 3,75,001 rs..Ishwarbhai Kacharabhai Patel Parivar.

References 

Villages in Gandhinagar district